Apleria is a genus of moths in the family Geometridae described by Warren in 1901.

References

Larentiinae
Geometridae genera